Bakary Fofana is a former minister for foreign affairs for Guinea. 
He served from 17 February 2010 to 21 December 2010, under Prime Minister Jean Marie Dore.

References

Living people
Government ministers of Guinea
Place of birth missing (living people)
Year of birth missing (living people)
Union for the Progress of Guinea politicians
21st-century Guinean people